Feelings are subjective self-contained phenomenal experiences. According to the APA Dictionary of Psychology, a feeling is "a self-contained phenomenal experience"; and feelings are "subjective, evaluative, and independent of the sensations, thoughts, or images evoking them". The term feeling is closely related to, but not the same as emotion. "Feeling" may for instance refer to the conscious subjective experience of emotions. The study of subjective experiences is referred to as phenomenology. The discipline of psychotherapy generally involves a therapist helping a client understand, articulate and learn to effectively regulate their own feelings and ultimately take responsibility for their experience of the world. Feelings are sometimes held to be characteristic of embodied consciousness.

The English noun feelings may generally refer to any degree of subjectivity in perception or sensation. However, feelings often refer to an individual sense of well-being (perhaps of wholeness, safety or being loved.) Feelings have a semantic field extending from the individual and spiritual to the social and political. The word feeling may refer to any of a number of psychological characteristics of experience, or even to reflect the entire inner life of the individual (see mood.) As self-contained phenomenal experiences, evoked by sensations and perceptions, we might expect feelings to strongly influence the character of subjective reality; and indeed feelings may sometimes be seen to harbor bias or to in some way distort veridical perception, in particular through projection, wishful thinking, among many other such effects.

Feeling may also describe the senses, with an exemplary case being the physical sensation of touch.

History 

The modern conception of affect developed in the 19th century with Wilhelm Wundt. The word comes from the German Gefühl, meaning “feeling.”

A number of experiments have been conducted in the study of social and psychological affective preferences (i.e., what people like or dislike). Specific research has been done on preferences, attitudes, impression formation, and decision-making. This research contrasts findings with recognition memory (old-new judgments), allowing researchers to demonstrate reliable distinctions between the two. Affect-based judgments and cognitive processes have been examined with noted differences indicated, and some argue affect and cognition are under the control of separate and partially independent systems that can influence each other in a variety of ways (Zajonc, 1980). Both affect and cognition may constitute independent sources of effects within systems of information processing. Others suggest emotion is a result of an anticipated, experienced, or imagined outcome of an adaptational transaction between organism and environment, therefore cognitive appraisal processes are keys to the development and expression of an emotion (Lazarus, 1982).

Emotions (in relation to feelings)

Difference between feelings from emotions 
The neuroscientist Antonio Damasio distinguishes between emotions and feelings: Emotions refer to mental images (i.e. representing either internal or external states of reality) and the bodily changes accompanying them, whereas feelings refer to the perception of bodily changes. In other words, emotions contain a subjective element and a 3rd person observable element, whereas feelings are subjective and private.

In general, the terms emotion and feelings are used as synonyms or interchangeable, but actually, they are not. The feeling is a conscious experience created after the physical sensation or emotional experience. Whereas emotions are felt through emotional experience. They are manifested in the unconscious mind and can be associated with thoughts, desires and actions.

Emotion regulation 

There are two main types of emotion work: evocation and suppression. Evocation is used to obtain or bring up a certain feeling and suppression is used to put away or hide certain unwanted feelings. Emotion work is done by an individual, others upon them, or them upon others. Emotion work is done to achieve a certain feeling that one believes one should feel.

Three more specific types of emotion work are cognitive, bodily, and expressive. Cognitive changes images, bodily changes physical aspects, and expressive changes gestures. A person who is sad uses expressive emotion work to lift their spirits by trying to smile. A person who is stressed may use bodily emotion work by, for example, trying to breathe slower in order to lower stress levels.

Emotion work allows individuals to change their feelings so that the emotions suit the current situation (or are deemed appropriate). Since individuals want to fit in and be seen as normal, they are constantly working on their feelings in order to fit the situations they are in.

Social class 
Class differences influence and varies how a parent raises their child. Middle-class parents tend to raise their child through the use of feelings and lower-class parents tend to raise their children through behavior control. Middle-class parents and lower-class parents raise their children to be like them feeling and behavioral wise. Middle-class children get reprimanded for feeling the wrong way and lower-class children are punished for behaving badly.

Lionel Trilling, an author and literary critic, described the technique that the middle- and the lower-class parents use. Under-working and overworking their children's feelings causes them to seek approval of their feelings in the future. When children of lower-class and of working-class families join the workforce, they are less prepared for emotional management than middle-class children. However, the working-class and the middle-class tend to complain of over-management or micromanagement of feelings that distract them from actual work.

Sensations

Sensation occurs when sense organs collect various stimuli (such as a sound or smell) for transduction, meaning transformation into a form that can be understood by the nervous system.

Interoception

Gut

A gut feeling, or gut reaction, is a visceral emotional reaction to something. It may be negative, such as a feeling of uneasiness, or positive, such as a feeling of trust. Gut feelings are generally regarded as not modulated by conscious thought, but sometimes as a feature of intuition rather than rationality. The idea that emotions are experienced in the gut has a long historical legacy, and many nineteenth-century doctors considered the origins of mental illness to derive from the intestines.

The phrase "gut feeling" may also be used as a shorthand term for an individual's "common sense" perception of what is considered "the right thing to do", such as helping an injured passerby, avoiding dark alleys and generally acting in accordance with instinctive feelings about a given situation. It can also refer to simple common knowledge phrases which are true no matter when said, such as "Water is wet" or "Fire is hot", or to ideas that an individual intuitively regards as true (see "truthiness" for examples).

Heart

The heart has a collection of ganglia that is called the "intrinsic cardiac nervous system". The feelings of affiliation, love, attachment, anger, hurt are usually associated with the heart, especially the feeling of love.

Needs 

A need is something required to sustain a healthy life (e.g. air, water, food). A (need) deficiency causes a clear adverse outcome:  a dysfunction or death. Abraham H. Maslow, pointed out that satisfying (i.e., gratification of) a need, is just as important as deprivation (i.e., motivation to satisfy), for it releases the focus of the satisfied need, to other emergent needs

Motivation 

Motivation is what explains why people or animals initiate, continue or terminate a certain behavior at a particular time. Motivational states are commonly understood as forces acting within the agent that create a disposition to engage in goal-directed behavior. It is often held that different mental states compete with each other and that only the strongest state determines behavior.

Valence 

Valence tells organisms (e.g., humans) how well or how bad an organism is doing (in relation to the environment), for meeting the organism's needs.

Perception

Feelings of certainty 

The way that we see other people express their emotions or feelings determines how we respond. The way an individual responds to a situation is based on feeling rules. If an individual is uninformed about a situation the way they respond would be in a completely different demeanor than if they were informed about a situation. For example, if a tragic event had occurred and they had knowledge of it, their response would be sympathetic to that situation. If they had no knowledge of the situation, then their response may be indifference.  A lack of knowledge or information about an event can shape the way an individual sees things and the way they respond.

Timothy D. Wilson, a psychology professor, tested this theory of the feeling of uncertainty along with his colleague Yoav Bar-Anan, a social psychologist. Wilson and Bar-Anan found that the more uncertain or unclear an individual is about a situation, the more invested they are. Since an individual does not know the background or the ending of a story they are constantly replaying an event in their mind which is causing them to have mixed feelings of happiness, sadness, excitement, and et cetera.  If there is any difference between feelings and emotions, the feeling of uncertainty is less sure than the emotion of ambivalence: the former is precarious, the latter is not yet acted upon or decided upon.

The neurologist Robert Burton, writes in his book On Being Certain, that feelings of certainty may stem from involuntary mental sensations, much like emotions or perceptual recognition (another example might be the tip of the tongue phenomenon).

Individuals in society want to know every detail about something in hopes to maximize the feeling for that moment, but Wilson found that feeling uncertain can lead to something being more enjoyable because it has a sense of mystery. In fact, the feeling of not knowing can lead them to constantly think and feel about what could have been.

Sense of agency & sense of ownership

Feelings about feelings 

Individuals in society predict that something will give them a certain desired outcome or feeling. Indulging in what one might have thought would've made them happy or excited might only cause a temporary thrill, or it might result in the opposite of what was expected and wanted. Events and experiences are done and relived to satisfy one's feelings.

Details and information about the past is used to make decisions, as past experiences of feelings tend to influence current decision-making, how people will feel in the future, and if they want to feel that way again. Gilbert and Wilson conducted a study to show how pleased a person would feel if they purchased flowers for themselves for no specific reason (birthday, anniversary, or promotion etc.) and how long they thought that feeling would last. People who had no experience of purchasing flowers for themselves and those who had experienced buying flowers for themselves were tested. Results showed that those who had purchased flowers in the past for themselves felt happier and that feeling lasted longer for them than for a person who had never experienced purchasing flowers for themselves.

Arlie Russell Hochschild, a sociologist, depicted two accounts of emotion. The organismic emotion is the outburst of emotions and feelings. In organismic emotion, emotions/feelings are instantly expressed. Social and other factors do not influence how the emotion is perceived, so these factors have no control on how or if the emotion is suppressed or expressed.

In interactive emotion, emotions and feelings are controlled. The individual is constantly considering how to react or what to suppress. In interactive emotion, unlike in organismic emotion, the individual is aware of their decision on how they feel and how they show it.

Erving Goffman, a sociologist and writer, compared how actors withheld their emotions to the everyday individual. Like actors, individuals can control how emotions are expressed, but they cannot control their inner emotions or feelings. Inner feelings can only be suppressed in order to achieve the expression one wants people to see on the outside. Goffman explains that emotions and emotional experience are an ongoing thing that an individual is consciously and actively working through. Individuals want to conform to society with their inner and outer feelings.

Anger, happiness, joy, stress, and excitement are some of the feelings that can be experienced in life. In response to these emotions, our bodies react as well. For example, nervousness can lead to the sensation of having "knots in the stomach" or "butterflies in the stomach".

Self-harm 

Negative feelings can lead to harm. When an individual is dealing with an overwhelming amount of stress and problems in their lives, there is the possibility that they might consider self-harm. When one is in a good state of feeling, they never want it to end; conversely, when someone is in a bad state of mind, they want that feeling to disappear. Inflicting harm or pain to oneself is sometimes the answer for many individuals because they want something to keep their mind off the real problem. These individuals cut, stab, and starve themselves in an effort to feel something other than what they currently feel, as they believe the pain to be not as bad as their actual problem. Distraction is not the only reason why many individuals choose to inflict self-harm. Some people inflict self-harm to punish themselves for feeling a certain way. Other psychological factors could be low self-esteem, the need to be perfect, social anxiety, and so much more.

See also 

 Affect
 Alexithymia
 Consciousness
 Cognitive neuroscience
 Emotion in animals
 Hard problem of consciousness
 Intuition
 Mind-Body Problem 
 Mood
 Myers-Briggs Type Indicator
 Needs
 Pain
 Psychological Types
 Psychosomatic illness
 Qualia
 Sensation (psychology)
 Vedanā, the Buddhist concept of feeling

Footnotes

External links

Further reading 

 Madge, N., Hewitt, A., Hawton, K., Wilde, E.J.D., Corcoran, P., Fekete, S., Heeringen, K.V., Leo, D.D. and Ystgaard, M., 2008. Deliberate self‐harm within an international community sample of young people: comparative findings from the Child & Adolescent Self‐harm in Europe (CASE) Study. Journal of child Psychology and Psychiatry, 49(6), pp.667-677.
 Mruk, C. (2006). Self-Esteem research, theory, and practice: Toward a positive psychology of self-esteem (3rd ed.). New York: Springer.

 
Qualia
Consciousness